This is a list of the National Register of Historic Places listings in Wood County, Texas.

This is intended to be a complete list of properties and districts listed on the National Register of Historic Places in Wood County, Texas. There are one district and nine individual properties listed on the National Register in the county. Two individually listed properties are Recorded Texas Historic Landmarks while the district contains more.

Current listings

The publicly disclosed locations of National Register properties and districts may be seen in a mapping service provided.

|}

See also

National Register of Historic Places listings in Texas
Recorded Texas Historic Landmarks in Wood County

References

External links

Registered Historic Places
Wood County
Buildings and structures in Wood County, Texas